The Audi Steppenwolf was a concept car produced by Audi and presented at the Paris Motor Show in 2000. The Steppenwolf was a study for a three-door compact crossover SUV based on the Volkswagen Group PQ34 platform used in the contemporary Audi A3 and Audi TT. Powered by a 3.2L V6 engine with four-wheel drive, the Steppenwolf had several novel features, including four-level adjustable air suspension (similar to the Audi allroad quattro), a removable carbon fibre hardtop or optional soft top, and an electro-hydraulic parking brake.

The Steppenwolf didn't result directly in a production model. However, six years later, Audi presented the Audi Cross Coupé quattro, another concept car in the same class, which was the basis of a production version called the Audi Q3 for 2011.

Sources

References 

Steppenwolf
All-wheel-drive vehicles